Monroe School may refer to:

Monroe School (Phoenix, Arizona), listed on the National Register of Historic Places in Maricopa County, Arizona
Monroe School (Sandusky, Ohio), listed on the National Register of Historic Places in Sandusky, Ohio

See also
Monroe County Schools (disambiguation)